"Clear" is a 1983 electro song performed by the American group Cybotron, and composed by Cybotron members Juan Atkins and Richard Davis.

Commercial performance and reception 
Dennis Romero of Los Angeles Times in 1993 described the "Kraftwerk-sampling song" as "[i]nspired by Afrika Bambaataa's [...] 'Planet Rock' " and filled "with high-flying synthesizer loops, hard-driving beats and sparse, Chipmunk-style vocals-all elements", used in later techno songs as of September 1993.

At least fifty thousand copies of the "Clear" single were sold, according to a 1997 article in The Wire, which describes the song as a "groundbreaking…first-generation piece of pure machine music."

Cyclone Wehner of the Gold Coast Bulletin in 2005 described the song as precedence of Detroit techno and "Timbaland's tech-hop".

Later uses 
The song's instantly recognizable loop has been sampled by many rap and hip-hop artists such as Missy Elliott's "Lose Control", and Poison Clan's "Shake Whatcha Mama Gave Ya". The song appears in the 2002 video game Grand Theft Auto: Vice City  in the radio station Wildstyle Pirate Radio.

References

External links
 Jon Savage on song: Cybotron – Techno City The Guardian Music Blog

1983 songs
Electronic songs
Songs written by Juan Atkins
Song recordings produced by Juan Atkins